The Elan 6L8 is a four-stroke, naturally-aspirated, OHV, V-8 racing Internal combustion engine, designed, developed and built by American manufacturing company Élan Motorsport Technologies, in partnership and collaboration with Roush-Yates, for sports car racing, between 1997 and 2005. The engine itself is based on the block of the Windsor engine, but the engine itself is also derived, and uses the technology from the Modular engine.

Applications 
Riley & Scott Mk III
Panoz GTR-1
Panoz LMP-1 Roadster-S

References

Panoz Auto Development
Ford engines
V8 engines
Engines by model
Gasoline engines by model